The Liberal Reformist Party was a political party in Puerto Rico founded by Pedro Gerónimo Goyco, José Julián Acosta and Roman Baldorioty de Castro in 1870. It was the first political party ever to be established in Puerto Rico.

The party was formed following the Grito de Lares revolt. Unlike the other party at the time, the Liberal Conservative Party, and which advocated assimilation into the political party system of Spain, the Autonomists—as the Liberal Reformist Party supporters were called—advocated decentralization away from Spanish control.

The party was led by Pedro Gerónimo Goyco (president), José Julián Acosta, José Celis Aguilera, Román Baldorioty de Castro, Julián Blanco, Nicolás Aguayo and Manuel Corchado Juarbe.

References

See also

 José Manuel García Leduc. Apuntes para una historia breve de Puerto Rico: desde la prehistoria hasta 1898. San Juan, Puerto Rico : Editorial Isla Negra, 2009.

Defunct political parties in Puerto Rico
Political parties established in 1870
1870 establishments in Puerto Rico